Velocity Signs is a sign-waving machine manufacturer based in Sacramento, California. The company produces portable and rechargeable sign-waving machines. Scott Adams is Velocity Signs' President and CEO. The company appeared on Shark Tank in April 2014.

History
In 2006, Scott Adams and Josh Faherty, an engineer, developed the idea for a sign-waving machine. They began manufacturing devices in 2009. The machines are made in the United States. During Velocity Signs' first year, it generated $257,000 in sales. The company appeared on Shark Tank in April 2014. Velocity Signs was selected from a pool of 30,000 applicants to appear on the television show. Mark Cuban, Robert Herjavec and Kevin O'Leary invested $225,000 for a 30% interest in the company. Lori Greiner and Barbara Corcoran also offered funding. Velocity Signs' clients include Subway, Burger King and Chevrolet and Ford automobile dealerships.

References

Manufacturing companies established in 2006
Companies based in Sacramento, California
American companies established in 2006